Sayyad Agha Haider (also spelt as Syed Agha Hyder) (1876−1947) was a barrister and judge in British India. He is known for refusing to pass the death sentence to Bhagat Singh, Sukhdev Thapar and Shivaram Rajguru in the 1930 Lahore conspiracy case. He was a former judge of Lahore High Court.

Family
Haider had son, Zargham Haider (who died at age 12) and two daughters, Ameer Bano and Shehar Bano.

Biography 
He was born in 1876 in a Zamindar family in Saharanpur. In 1904, he started practicing as a lawyer in Allahabad High Court, where he was later elevated to the bench. He was appointed as the Judge in the Lahore High Court in 1925.

He was a member of the Special Tribunal at Lahore to try Bhagat Singh, Sukhdev, Rajguru and other Indian revolutionaries for waging war against the British Empire. He was the only Indian member in the tribunal. The other tribunal members were Justice J. Coldstream, who was the panel chairman and Justice G.C. Hilton. On May 12, 1930, Bhagat Singh and his compatriots were brought to Poonch House in Lahore, where the trial was held.

In protest against being handcuffed, Singh and his comrades refused to get down from the police bus, shouting slogans and singing patriotic songs instead. Justice J. Coldstream ordered the police to use force on them in the courtroom, which was objected to by Justice Haider, who refused to sign the day's proceedings and record his dissent.

He had objected to the lack of even-handedness in the Lahore Conspiracy Case trial. Justice Agha Haider was removed by the British Government from the tribunal because he questioned the witnesses closely and repeatedly dissociated himself in writing from their orders, unlike the two European judges. While dissenting with British Judges in the Bhagat Singh case, Justice Haider said, I am a judge, not a butcher.

Syed Agha Haider died on February 5, 1947, in Saharanpur, Uttar Pradesh.

See also 
 Shadi Lal
 Abdul Qadir
 Lahore Conspiracy Case trial

References 

1876 births
1947 deaths
People from Saharanpur
Indian judges
Judges of the Lahore High Court
Indian barristers

Judges in British India
Lawyers in British India